The Hostmaster Pattern was manufactured by New Martinsville Glass Company (which later became Viking Glass Company) during the 1930s. Though the line was extensive, New Martinsville Hostmaster Pattern is one of the lesser known patterns of Elegant Glass. There are no reproductions as the mold was melted down to make the Raindrops pattern (line #14).

New Martinsville Glass Company
The New Martinsville Glass Company opened in 1901 in New Martinsville, West Virginia. They were renowned for the use of color in their glassware. They promoted liquor sets even through Prohibition. The company was renamed Viking Glass in 1944.

Colors
Colors for the Hostmaster pattern included Cobalt, Amethyst, Ruby, Amber, Evergreen (dark green), Crystal, and Pink.

Quality
Many of the pieces in this pattern are made from a 3 or 4 part mold. All pieces have been fire-polished after being pressed. The surface of the pieces are smooth and glossy. They have few air bubbles and when held up to the light, there are not many ripples or irregularities. The bases of the tumblers and plates have been hand ground down allowing them to lay flat. The creamer, sugars, tea cup, decanter, and ice bucket do not have a ground base.

Aliases
Repeal: this pattern was released in 1933 to celebrate the repeal of prohibition. The release in included a decanter and other pieces of bar-ware. An advertisement has been found with the title "Repeal Set" over a liquor set, but it is doubtful that this was intended to be a name for the pattern.

Pattern #38: This is the company manufacturer number.

Pieces manufactured
Bitters Bottle
Cocktail Shaker
Creamer
Cup & Saucer
Decanter (12½”)
Flared Bowl (12")
Flat Tumbler (9 Oz / 4½”)
Footed Tumbler
Highball Glass (10 OZ)
Ice Bucket (3½”)
Jigger
Luncheon Plate (8½”)
Old Fashioned (7 OZ)
Pitcher
Platter
Pretzel Jar (Covered)
Sherbet
Shot Glass (2 OZ)
Soup Bowl
Sugar
Vase
Water Goblet

Gallery
Tea Cups

Plates

Stemware

Tumblers

Cream & Sugar

Bowl

Decanter

See also
Elegant Glass
Depression Glass
Pressed glass
Vaseline glass

References

External links
Elegant Glass Identification:
 Depression Glass Identification by SuzieMax
 Maker Marks by David Doty's Carnival Glass Website
 Glass Company Histories, Glass Patterns /Colors/ Definitions
 Worth Point - Elegant Glass VS. Depression Glass

Collecting
History of glass